The Playroom is a 2012 American drama film directed by Julia Dyer. It has a 50% on Rotten Tomatoes based on 12 reviews.

Cast
 John Hawkes as Martin Cantwell - Father
 Molly Parker as Donna Cantwell - Mother
 Olivia Harris as Maggie Cantwell - Teen daughter 
 Jonathan McClendon as Christian - Son
 Alexandra Doke as Janie - Daughter
 Ian Veteto as Sam
 Lydia Mackay as Nadia Knotts
 Jonathan Brooks as Clark Knotts
 Cody Linley as Ryan

References

External links
 

2012 films
2012 drama films
American drama films
2010s English-language films
2010s American films